The Evangelical Alliance (EA) is a national evangelical alliance, member of the World Evangelical Alliance. Founded in 1846, the activities of the Evangelical Alliance aim to promote evangelical Christian beliefs in government, media and society. The Evangelical Alliance is based in London, with offices in Cardiff, Glasgow and Belfast.

History
The Evangelical Alliance was founded in 1846 by Ridley Haim Herschell, Rev. Edward Steane – a Baptist pastor from Camberwell – John Henderson and Sir Culling Eardley, 3rd Baronet. Eardley became the organisation's first chairperson, leading the Alliance in its various campaigns for religious freedom; in 1852, Eardley campaigned on behalf of the Tuscan prisoners of conscience Francesco Madiai and Rosa Madiai, who had been imprisoned for their Protestant faith.

Overview
The Evangelical Alliance works across 79 different denominations of Christianity, 750 organisations, and has 3,300 member churches.

The Evangelical Alliance's CEO is Gavin Calver. Peter Lynas is the UK Director, with Fred Drummond acting as Director of Scotland and Siân Rees as Director of Wales. A number of Members of Parliament are associated with the Evangelical Alliance: Conservative MP and former Conservative Party leadership candidate Stephen Crabb is associated with the Alliance through Gweini (The Council of the Christian Voluntary Sector in Wales); Conservative MP Stuart Anderson is associated with the Alliance through the Freedom Church; and Conservative MP for Congleton Fiona Bruce is a member of the Evangelical Alliance. Member organisations include Tearfund, an organisation originally established by the Alliance.

Positions
The Evangelical Alliance has historically supported ecumenism – the principle of unity between different church doctrines – with the Roman Catholic Church, an approach criticised by some as in direct contradiction to the beliefs of the Evangelical Alliance's founders. In 2019, the Alliance supported the 'Thy Kingdom Come' initiative – an event organised by the Archbishops of York and Canterbury to bring more people to Christianity through a sustained period of prayer from the dates of the Feast of the Ascension to Pentecost annually.

According to a 2016 Private Eye report, the Evangelical Alliance is openly opposed to homosexuality and same-sex relationships, preaching sexual abstinence for those with same-sex attractions, with membership for openly lesbian and gay people open only to those who "come to see the need to be transformed" from their same-sex attraction.

However the Evangelical Alliance's website distinguishes between same-sex attraction and same-sex sexual relations, rejecting only the latter: "We encourage evangelical congregations to welcome and accept sexually active lesbians and gay men. However, they should do so in the expectation that they, like all of us who are living outside God’s purposes, will come in due course to see the need to be transformed and live in accordance with biblical revelation and orthodox church teaching. We urge gentleness, patience and ongoing pastoral care during this process and after a person renounces same-sex sexual relations."

References

Further reading
Massie, James William (1847), The Evangelical Alliance, Its Origin and Development.
De Kewer Williams, John. The Basis of the Evangelical Alliance (1847).
Thompson, Todd. "The Evangelical Alliance, Religious Liberty, and the Evangelical Conscience in Nineteenth-Century Britain," Journal of Religious History (2009), 33#1, pp. 49–65.

External links

 
 

National evangelical alliances
Christian organisations based in the United Kingdom
Evangelical denominations established in the 19th century
1846 establishments in the United Kingdom
Evangelicalism in the United Kingdom
Organisations based in the London Borough of Islington
Religion in the London Borough of Islington
Religious organizations established in 1846